Julio Rivera may refer to:
 Julio Rivera (footballer), Peruvian footballer
 Julio Adalberto Rivera Carballo, president of El Salvador
 Murder of Julio Rivera, 1990 hate crime where a gay 29-year old man was murdered in the Jackson Heights neighborhood in New York City